James Ellis may refer to:

Arts and entertainment
James G. Ellis (composer) (1880–1966), American violinist, silent film theater pioneer, and composer
James Ellis (actor) (1931–2014), British actor
James Ellis (musician), British rock guitarist and record producer

Politics and law
James Ellis (antiquary) (1763–1830), English lawyer and antiquary
James Ellis (British politician) (1829–1901), British MP for Bosworth 1885–1892
James Ellis (Australian politician) (1843–1930), Australian politician
James A. Ellis (1864–1934), mayor of Ottawa
James M. Ellis, lawyer and state legislator in West Virginia
James F. Ellis (1870–1937), Canadian physician and politician

Others
James Ellis (footballer) (fl. 1892), Scottish footballer
Mooney Ellis (James Ellis, born 1896), American baseball player
James H. Ellis (1924–1997), British engineer and cryptographer
James G. Ellis (born 1947), American academic; dean of the Marshall School of Business at the University of Southern California
James O. Ellis (born 1947), U.S. Navy admiral

See also
Jim Ellis (disambiguation)
Jimmy Ellis (disambiguation)